Erica Howe (born July 17, 1992) is an ice hockey goaltender, currently with the PWHPA. As a member of the gold medal winning squad at the 2010 IIHF World Women's U18 Championship, a hockey card of her was featured in the Upper Deck 2010 World of Sports card series. She was the first goaltender selected in the 2014 CWHL Draft, claimed by the Brampton Thunder. She made her debut with the Canada women's national ice hockey team at the 2014 4 Nations Cup.

Playing career
Howe was the starting goaltender for the Ottawa Lady Senators of the Provincial Women's Hockey League in 2009–10.

Hockey Canada
She was an assistant captain for 2008 Team Ontario Red and was a member of the 2009 Gold-Medal winning Team Ontario Red at the Under-18 Nationals. Howe was invited to the 2009 Canadian Women’s Under-18 Team Strength and Conditioning Camp along with the 2009 Canadian Women’s Under-18 Selection Camp. In August 2009, she was a member of the Canadian Women’s Under-18 Team squad that participated in a three-game series vs. Team USA. In April 2010, Howe was the goaltender for Canada at the Under-18 World Championship, as the Canadian team won the Gold Medal. To celebrate the gold medal win, she participated in the Canada Celebrates Event on June 30 in Edmonton, Alberta which recognized the Canadian Olympic and World hockey champions from the 2009–10 season .

NCAA
Howe joined the Clarkson Golden Knights women's ice hockey program in the autumn of 2010. She was also recruited by Vermont, Cornell, St. Lawrence, Connecticut and Brown. On January 28, 2011, Howe had twenty-six saves vs. Quinnipiac (including eleven in the third period) in a 3–2 road win. The following day, she posted twenty saves in a 3–2 win vs. Princeton. With the two wins, she extended her winning streak to four games. During the month of October 2011, she played every second of goal for the Clarkson Golden Knights. She helped the Golden Knights enjoy a seven-game unbeaten streak (4–0–3) while playing in two games with more than thirty saves.

The 2013–14 Clarkson Golden Knights women's ice hockey season marked her final season with the program. Of note, she was the starting goaltender as Clarkson captured the 2014 NCAA National Collegiate Women's Ice Hockey Tournament.

CWHL
Howe gained the win for Team Red in the inaugural 2014 CWHL All-Star Game. Howe would return to the CWHL All-Star Game in 2017, played for Team Blue in a 9-5 loss at the 3rd CWHL All-Star Game.

Making her CWHL debut in an October 19, 2014 home game against the Calgary Inferno, Howe made 33 saves in a 5-2 loss. In her second game, a November 15 home contest against the Montreal Stars, Howe would record the first win of her CWHL career. Needing only 19 saves, Howe would prevail in a 4-2 final.

Career statistics

Hockey Canada

NCAA

CWHL

Awards and honours
ECAC Goaltender of the Week (Week of February 1, 2011)
2010–11 ECAC All-Rookie team
ECAC Goaltender of the Week (Week of October 18, 2011)
ECAC Goaltender of the Week (Week of October 25, 2011)
ECAC Goaltender of the Month (Month of October 2011)
ECAC Defensive Player of the week (Week of November 14, 2011)
ECAC Goaltender of the Month (Month of November 2011)
Nominee, 2012 ECAC Goaltender of the Year
Finalist, ECAC Player of the Year (2011–12)
2013 ECAC Goaltender of the Year 
2013 All-USCHO.com All-Star team

References

External links
 

1992 births
Living people
Brampton Thunder players
Canadian women's ice hockey goaltenders
Clarkson Cup champions
Clarkson Golden Knights women's ice hockey players
Ice hockey people from Ottawa
Professional Women's Hockey Players Association players